= Ato-sees =

Ask-wee-da-eed is a Native American mythological figure of the Algonquian Abenaki people. The figure is a shaman who is half-snake, half-man. He forces humans to find the materials with which he would cook them, before he was killed by Moosbas.
